Angelo Lekkas (born 29 June 1976) is a former Australian rules footballer who played his entire professional career with the Hawthorn Football Club in the Australian Football League (AFL).  After a stellar year playing in the TAC competition with the Northern knights in 1993 and winning the best and fairest he was highly sought after by AFL clubs being a first round pick in the AFL draft and number 17 overall.

Early life
Lekkas was born to Greek parents and grew up in the northern suburbs of Melbourne. Raised by a single mother he has often attributed a lot of his success to his mother's strong personality.

AFL career
Lekkas was taken by Hawthorn at pick number 17 overall (Hawthorn's first pick) in the 1993 AFL Draft which was a trade for Tony Hall (when Hall left the Hawks for Adelaide).

Arriving at the Hawthorn football club at a time of so many great premiership players meant that Lekkas would spend the first couple years in the reserves while the team would transition into a rebuild.

Lekkas blossomed under coach Ken Judge. starting his career in the seniors as a defender with some midfield glimpses. Lekkas then evolved his game to be one of the main midfielders in the Hawks team being a dynamic midfielder who would regularly kick goals. 

In 1999, he was a Victorian state representative
In 2002, he represented Australia in the International Rules series.

After a practice match in February 2005, Lekkas suffered an apparent minor stroke and was told he might never play again. Losing some coordination, Lekkas committed himself to a rehabilitation program and inside 3 months fully recovered.
He made a successful return to AFL football in round 14, 2005, against Geelong where he kicked 3 goals in the first half.

Lekkas shocked most at Hawthorn when he announced his early retirement from AFL football on 26 August 2005, his last game being played at the MCG against Sydney on 27 August 2005. In his retirement speech he told the media that the Hawthorn Football club was a blessing in his life and when asked if he felt like the unluckiest man in the world he responded "for the good that has happened to me playing this game, i wouldn't touch it".

Lekkas finished his AFL career with 180 games and 120 goals to his credit and a career total of 14 Brownlow votes.

Ambassadorial roles
Lekkas was named the 2005 stroke foundation Ambassador and in 2007 awarded the Australian football league multi cultural ambassador.
Lekkas was selected to attend the 2005 Anzac presentation in Gallipoli, Turkey to represent the AFL along with legend Ron Barassi. His AFL role would also take him to South Africa in 2007, where he would oversee a program to encourage the growth of Australian football.

Return to Australian rules
After a period of disenchantment with the game, Angelo returned to work with the AFL in 2007 as part-time as a multicultural officer  and AFL ambassador and also in a community liaison role at Hawthorn as part of the settlement with the club.

Present day
Lekkas now currently runs his own private sports tuition company with a focus on helping fast track young footballers overall development. 
Saying that he is passionate about assisting in the development of the next generation of potential AFL players 
Lekkas also runs a mortgage brokering company based in Collins street, Melbourne.

References

1976 births
Australian rules footballers from Melbourne
Australian people of Greek descent
Hawthorn Football Club players
Victorian State of Origin players
Northern Knights players
Living people
Australia international rules football team players
People from Williamstown, Victoria